M-77 is a state trunkline highway in the Upper Peninsula (UP) of the US state of Michigan. It starts at US Highway 2 (US 2) near Blaney Park north of Lake Michigan. The highway borders the eastern edge of the  Seney National Wildlife Refuge and passes through the community of Germfask. At Seney, it overlaps M-28 to cross the Fox River before returning northward. The northern half has been designated as a Scenic Spur of the Lake Superior Circle Tour. M-77 runs along the eastern end of the Pictured Rocks National Lakeshore and terminates in Grand Marais north of H-58 near Lake Superior. Originally designated by 1919, the highway has not been changed much in its history. By the late 1950s, the highway was paved, completing the modern M-77 highway.

Route description

From US 2 near Blaney Park going north, M-77 runs past the former Blaney Park Resort and out of town by a small private airport next to Lake Ann Louise. The highway continues through rural woodlands past Chip Lake. The road crosses the Manistique River as it runs through Germfask. From just south of Germfask to just south of Seney, the road forms the eastern boundary of the Seney National Wildlife Refuge.

The refuge is a managed wetland in Schoolcraft County in Michigan. Established in 1935, it has an area of  bordered by M-28 and M-77 that is the remains of the Great Manistique Swamp, a perched sand wetland located in the central UP. The refuge contains the Strangmoor Bog National Natural Landmark within its boundaries. During the 1930s, work crews employed by the Civilian Conservation Corps (CCC) rebuilt, restored, and expanded the wetland drains, this time for active wetlands management purposes.  These CCC ponds and drains are still used by the wetlands managers that staff the current National Wildlife Refuge.

At Seney, M-77 crosses a line of the Canadian National Railway and turns east along M-28. Both run concurrently for less than half a mile (0.8 km) over a crossing of the Fox River before M-77 turns back northward. The trunkline continues along several other lakes before turning northeasterly and then northward. Within Grand Marais, the highway follows Lake Avenue through downtown. M-77 intersects H-58 in town and the two designations run concurrently for two blocks. The trunkline continues one block farther north and ends at an intersection with Braziel Street by the Grand Marais harbor; the roadway continues northward as Lake Avenue at that point.

Since the Tour runs only along state trunklines in Michigan, a Scenic Spur of the tour was created to route traffic north from Seney to Grand Marais. The scenic spur also terminates in Grand Marais with M-77 north of the junction with H-58.

M-77 is maintained by the Michigan Department of Transportation (MDOT) like other state highways in Michigan. As a part of these maintenance responsibilities, the department tracks the volume of traffic that uses the roadways under its jurisdiction. These volumes are expressed using a metric called annual average daily traffic, which is a statistical calculation of the average daily number of vehicles on a segment of roadway. MDOT's surveys in 2009 showed that the highest traffic levels along M-77 were the 1,924 vehicles daily between Floodwood and Ten Curves roads in Schoolcraft county; the lowest counts were the 799 vehicles per day north of M-28 in Seney. No section of M-77 has been listed on the National Highway System, a network of roads important to the country's economy, defense, and mobility.

History
The route was first designated by July 1, 1919, with a route very close to its present course. The last segments of gravel road were paved in 1958–59.

Major intersections

See also

References

External links

M-77 at Michigan Highways

Seney National Wildlife Refuge

077
Transportation in Schoolcraft County, Michigan
Transportation in Alger County, Michigan